Yehuda Zadok (also "Tzadok"; יהודה צדוק; born December 29, 1958) is an Israeli former Olympic runner. He set Israeli records in the 3000 metre race in 1980, and in the 3000 metre steeplechase in 1984. At the 1981 Maccabiah Games, he won the 10,000 
metres race.

Zadok was born in Israel, and is Jewish.

Running career
His personal best in the 3000 metre race is an Israeli record 8:09.0 which he ran in 1980, and his personal best in the 3000 metre steeplechase was an Israeli record 8:35.41, in 1984.

He competed for Israel at the 1984 Summer Olympics in Los Angeles, California, at the age of 25. In the Men's 3,000 metres Steeplechase he came in 9th in Heat 3 with a time of 8:42.28.

In 1985 and 1986 he attended and ran track for Santa Monica College, coming in second at the 1985 Metropolitan Conference Championships, in Pacific Palisades, with a time of 20:51 in the four-mile cross-country race.

References 

Israeli male long-distance runners
Athletes (track and field) at the 1984 Summer Olympics
Santa Monica College alumni
Jewish male athletes (track and field)
Living people
Maccabiah Games medalists in athletics
Maccabiah Games gold medalists for Israel
Competitors at the 1981 Maccabiah Games
Olympic athletes of Israel
1958 births
Israeli steeplechase runners
Israeli Jews